is a professional Japanese baseball player. He plays pitcher for the Hiroshima Toyo Carp.

External links

NPB.com

1991 births
Living people
People from Itoshima, Fukuoka
Baseball people from Fukuoka Prefecture
Japanese expatriate baseball players in Puerto Rico
Nippon Professional Baseball pitchers
Yomiuri Giants players
Hiroshima Toyo Carp players
Leones de Ponce players